= Hospital Records Database =

The Hospital Records Database is a database provided by the Wellcome Trust and UK National Archives which provides information on the existence and location of the records of UK hospitals. This includes the location and dates of administrative and clinical records, the existence of catalogues, and links to some online hospital catalogues. The website was proposed as a resource of the month by the Royal Society of Medicine in 2009
